Studené is a municipality and village in Ústí nad Orlicí District in the Pardubice Region of the Czech Republic. It has about 200 inhabitants.

Administrative parts
The village of Bořitov is an administrative part of Studené.

References

Villages in Ústí nad Orlicí District